Greg Charles Kampe (born December 9, 1955) is an American college basketball coach and the current head men's basketball coach at Oakland University.  He guided the Golden Grizzlies to their first NCAA Division I tournament and tournament win in 2005. Through the 2016–17 season, he has compiled a  record in 33 seasons at Oakland University.

Kampe, a member of the Michigan Sports Hall of Fame, is one of nine Division I basketball coaches who have been at the same school for at least 25 seasons. Kampe won The Summit League's coach of the year four times, the most recent being in 2010 and 2011.

Kampe won his 500th career game January 26, 2013.

On May 30, 2017, Kampe was one of eight new inductees announced for the Michigan Sports Hall of Fame in Detroit. The ceremony takes place on September 15, 2017.

In the fall of 2017, Kampe was enshrined in the Basketball Coaches Association of Michigan (BCAM) Hall of Fame.

On February 16, 2018, Kampe won his 600th career game.

On March 8, 2023, Kampe became the current longest tenured Men’s College Basketball coach after Jim Boeheim retired after 47 years.

High school
Kampe played football, basketball and track and field at Defiance High School in Defiance, Ohio. As a senior, he was named to the football Class AAA defensive second team as a back. He was named to the basketball Class AAA All-District second team, averaging 20.8 points per game as a senior.

College
Kampe attending Bowling Green State University, where he played football and basketball. Kampe was a kicker, punter and cornerback on the football team. In a 16–14 win over Southern Mississippi in 1975, Kampe broke the Mid-American Conference and BGSU record for average yards per punt with 57.5. A 77-yard punt in the game also set the BGSU record for longest punt.

Charity
Kampe raised over $200,000 for the American Cancer Society in 2015 with an auction for rounds of golf at Oakland Hills Country Club with other NCAA college basketball coaches.

Head coaching record

See also
 List of college men's basketball coaches with 600 wins

References

1955 births
Living people
American men's basketball coaches
American men's basketball players
Basketball coaches from Ohio
Basketball players from Ohio
Bowling Green Falcons men's basketball players
College men's basketball head coaches in the United States
Oakland Golden Grizzlies men's basketball coaches
People from Defiance, Ohio
Toledo Rockets men's basketball coaches